Ogtay Abiloglu Samadov or Samedov (born 5 April 1952) is an Azerbaijani nuclear physicist who since 2015 has been director of the Institute of Radiation Problems of Azerbaijan National Academy of Sciences.

Early life and education
Samadov was born in Xol Qarabucaq, Neftchala in a family of teachers. In 1969, he graduated from the secondary school No.2 named after Nizami in Salyan and in 1975, he successfully graduated from physical department of Azerbaijan State University (now Baku State University). O. Samadov worked as a physics teacher at Kholgarabujag village secondary school in 1975-1979. In 1979, he worked as a head scientific worker in "Radiation Physics of Ferroelectrics" laboratory of the Institute of Radiation Problems.

Scientific activities 
Ogtay Samadov entered post-graduate course in the Institute of Radiation Problems in 1980. He defended thesis on “Study of dielectric and pyroelectric properties of phase transitions in spontaneously polarized crystals” in 1988 and got a degree of PhD in physics and mathematics.

Then, Samadov's further scientific activity was dedicated to the study of physical properties of relaxor ferroelectrics formed on the basis of TlInS2 and TlGaSe2 crystals and great practically important scientific results were obtained in this field. In 2006, he defended his doctoral dissertation on this subject. Superconductive compounds were obtained in Samadov's researches and superconductive temperature of these compounds was defined. The influence of radiation on superconductive temperature and special resistance was studied. Nanodomain relaxor state was studied by dielectric and electric measurements of irradiated, alloyed and intercalated semiconductor ferroelectrics.

Samadov is the author of the first studies on the field of radiation physics and technology of ferroelectrics, conducted in Azerbaijan. The main researches in the field of the radiation influence on phase transitions in spontaneously polarized crystals with oxygen-octahedral structure were conducted by him.

Scientist began his scientific researches with the study of the influence of electric and magnetic fields on structural phase transitions in different ferro and antiferroelectrics.

He is the author of more than 200 articles on radiation material sciences in journals including Ferroelectrics, Physica Status Solidi, International Journal of Theoretical and Applied Nano technology and others.

In 2013, Samadov got “professor” scientific name by the decision of Higher Attestation Commission under President of Azerbaijan. In 2014, he was selected as a head of laboratory of the Radiation Physics of Disordered Solids in the Institute of Radiation Problems of Azerbaijan National Academy of Sciences; in 2015, he was director of the same Institute. He organized expeditions to reveal distribution of radioactive isotopes and heavy metals in frontline, transboundary waters and sediments in order to ensure nuclear and radiation safety of the country and obtained results were presented to the state authorities. In order to prevent nuclear and radioactive materials smuggling and trafficking and nuclear terrorism in nuclear security and radiation safety of Azerbaijan, installation of special monitoring equipments and their maintenance in operating state in border crossing points, staff training courses for border and customs agency employees have been implemented out by the Institute of Radiation Problems with the support of the National Nuclear Security Administration within the U.S. Department of Energy. Development of new detectors for detecting the ionizing rays and expansion of radiation instrument making based on them in our country have been carried out.

O. Samadov is the head of the National INIS (International Nuclear Information System) Centre of Azerbaijan of the International Atomic Energy Agency (IAEA).He has been the winner of several projects of Science Development Fund under the president of Azerbaijan Republic, Science and Technology Center in Ukraine and these projects have been completed successfully. He has been selected a member of Organizing Committee of “Nuclear Sciences and Technologies” International Scientific Forum to be held in Almaty, Kazakhstan in September 2017. Has been elected as a corresponding member of Azerbaijan National Academy of Sciences on May 2, 2017.

O. Samadov has been engaged in studying the influence of external factors on phase transitions of ferroelectric and antiferroelectric and summarizing the achieved results, established the regularities for the first and second phase transitions in spontaneously polarized crystals for the first time. By injecting impurities with various ionic radius to TlİnS2 and TlGaSe2crystals, he has studied their dielectric, pyroelectric, electric properties and influence of γ-rays on these properties. He has shown that when alloying TlİnS2 crystal with Yan-Teylor atoms, the obtained compounds show the properties characteristic for relaxor ferroelectrics.

Studying the dielectric and electric relaxation, impedance spectrum, the scientist has observed superionic conductivity in TlGaTe2, TlİnTe2 and TlInSe2crystalsfor the first time.

Staff training 
Ogtay Samadov established a scientific school on pyroelectric, dielectric properties of ferro-antiferro and semiconductor-ferroelectrics, trained4 Ph.Ds and 1 Dr. of sciences. At present, 2 Doctor of Sciences and 3 Ph.D studies in radiation material sciences are being successfully conducted under his leadership.

Main scientific achievements 
1. Regularities for consistent phase transitions in spontaneous-polarized crystals have been given.

2. A new relax or ferroelectrics class has been determined on the base of TlİnS2 and TlGaSe2 crystals.

3. Superionic conductivity in TlİnS2 and TlGaSe2 crystals has been observed and its radiation dose dependence kinetics has been studied.

The results of these studies have been published in the form of article in 33 peer-reviewed scientific journals and 49 articles in Republic publications. He has 1 patent, 109 reports have been made in local and international conferences. Author of 191 scientific works. 43 articles have been published abroad.

Scientific works 
 1. Ferroelectricity and polytypism in TlGaSe2 crystals. Solid State Com, 1991, v.77, N.6, 453
 2. The spontaneous relaxor-ferroelectric transition of TlInS2 with cationic impurities. Journal of Optoelectronics and Advanced Materials, 2003, v.5, No.3,276
 3. Relaxor properties of TlInS2 composites with nanodomain state. Ferroelectrics, 2004, v. 298, 275.
 4. Релаксорные свойства и механизм проводимости γ- облученных кристаллов TllnS2. ФТТ, 2005, т.47, вып. 9, 1665
 5. Dielectric properties, conduction mechanism and possibility of nanodomain state with quantum dot formation in gamma-irradiated impurity-doped incommensurate TlInS2. Physica Status Solidi A 2006, 203, No. 11, 2845
 6. Conduction anisotropy of intercalated relaxer TllnS2<Ge>. Ferroelectrics. Russia /CIS/ Baltic/Japan Symposium on Ferroelectricity RCBJSF-9, Vilnius, Lithuania, 2008, 561
 7. Features of conductivity anisotropy of intercalated nanodimensional relaxor TllnS2<Ge>. Journal Scientific Israel-Technological Advantages Material engineering, 2009, v. 11, no.1,99
 8. Особенности проводимости γ- облученных кристаллов TlGaTe2 с наноцепочечной структурой. ФТП, 2010 том 44, вып.5, 610
 9. Гигантская диэлектрическая релаксация в кристаллах TlGaТе2. ФТТ, 2011, т.53, вып.8, 1488
 10. Суперионная проводимость кристаллах В  TlGaTe2. ФТП, 2011,том 45, вып.8, 1009
 11. Superionic conductivity in One-Dimensional Nanofibrous TiGaTe2 Crystals. Japanese Journal of Applied Physics. 50(2011), 05FCO9-1
 12. Суперионная проводимость, эффекты переключения и памяти в кристаллах TlInTe2 и TlInSe2. ФТП, 2011, том 45, вып.11, 1441
 13. Superionic Conductivity and γ –Radiation-Induced Effects in Nanofibrous TlGaTe2 Crystals. International Journal of  Theoretical and Applied  Nanotechnology. vol.1, Issel 1, 2012. p. 20-28.
 14. Ионная проводимость и диэлектрическая релаксация в кристаллах TlGaТе2 облученных γ- квантами. ФТП, 2013, т. 47, в.5, с.696-701.
 15. Поляризация вызванная объемыми зарядами и ионная проводимость в кристаллах TlInSe2. ФТП, 2014, т. 48, в.4, с.442-447.
 16. Prospective Application of A3B3C62 Type Semiconductors for Developing Nano-size Electronic Devices. International Journal of Theoretical and Applied Nanotechnology Volume 2, Issue 1, Year 2014 Journal ISSN 1929-2724 DOI: 10.11159/ ijtan.2014.00
 17. Impedance spectroscopy study of phase transitions to ionic and superionic conductivity states in Ag2S and Ag2Se. Physica Status Solidi C. Apr 24, 2015,1-5 (2015)/ DOI 10.1002/ pssc. 201400366.
 18. Temperature dependent spectroscopic ellipsometry of AgSe and AgS with phase transitions from ionic to superionic conductivity state. Physica Status Solidi C. 5 May 2015, DOI: 10.1002/pssc.201400367.

References 

 Samadov Ogtay Abil oglu- Official web site of Azerbaijan National Academy of Sciences

Living people
1952 births
People from Neftchala District
Baku State University alumni
Azerbaijani nuclear physicists
Soviet nuclear physicists